Ajmone Finestra (4 February 1921 – 26 April 2012) was an Italian politician who served as Senator (1979–1987) and Mayor of Latina (1993–2002).

References

1921 births
2012 deaths
Mayors of Latina, Lazio
Senators of Legislature VIII of Italy
Senators of Legislature IX of Italy
Italian Social Movement politicians